The Maitland Pickers Rugby League Football Club is an Australian rugby league football club based in Maitland, New South Wales formed in 1955. They currently play in the Newcastle Rugby League competition. Their nickname was originally the Pumpkin Pickers but is now abbreviated to just the Pickers.

History 
The Maitland Pumpkin Pickers were formed from a merger of Maitland United and Morpeth-East Maitland in the 1942 season after Maitland City struggled to field teams. During the 1940s, Newcastle Rugby League experienced a drastic change when the league was reduced from 10 to 8 teams after Morpeth-East Maitland made a departure at the start of the 1942 season and Eastern Suburbs folding before the semi-finals. It was decided the defunct Morpeth-East Maitland, would merge to form the Maitland Pumpkin Pickers. In 1933, Maitland won their maiden premiership.

The dominance began in the 1950s when Australian Representative, Don Adams led Maitland played in seven consecutive grand finals, winning three premierships in a row from 1956 to 1958. In the late 1960s and early 1970s, the Pickers continued to dominate, having made it to the grand final five consecutive years (three titles and two runners-ups).

In the early 2010s, Maitland found another period of success winning back-to-back premierships beating Cessnock 24–8 in 2010 and beating Western Suburbs 19–18. The Pickers were also minor premiers in two consecutive seasons between 2010 and 2011.

2015 and 2016 were difficult years for the club finishing with the wooden spoon in consecutive years, winning 3 out of 14 games in 2015 whilst concluding the 2016 season picking up only 1 win.

Name Origin 
The term "Pumpkin Pickers" was a sarcastic reference to the players bringing goods to the markets to sell when they went to games by train.

Notable Juniors 
 Greg Bird
 Luke Dorn
Peter Dimond
Andrew Everingham
John Graves
Chris Houston
Marvin Karawana
Kel O'Shea
Gavin Quinn
Terence Seu Seu
Frank Stanmore
Ryan Stig
Mark Taufua
Sione Tovo
Brock Lamb
Terry Pannowitz
Jim Morgan
Pasami Saulo

Sponsors 
 Club Maitland City
 Barbeques Galore Maitland
 Reid's Telarah Butchery
 Mitchell Physiotherapy
 Hyflow Plumbing
 Tassell Financial Planning
 Queens Arms Hotel
 Rotating Machine Solutions Pty Limited
 Ausure Insurance
 Windsor Castle Hotel
 Hunt Plant Hire
 Maitland Toyota
 Maitland Carpet Court
 Teasdale Tyres
 Cants Building & Construction
 Steggles
 Hunter Petroleum
 Maitland Mutual
 Maitland Mecury
 Good Sports Program
 Nepean Power
 One Stop Pine
 Australian Drug Foundation

See also

References

External links

Rugby clubs established in 1955
1955 establishments in Australia
Rugby league teams in Newcastle, New South Wales
Maitland, New South Wales